William Moss (4 September 1933 – 13 January 2010) was a British racing driver from England.

Moss entered one World Championship Formula One race, the 1959 British Grand Prix, with his United Racing Stable Cooper T51, a Formula 2 car, and failed to qualify.  Moss was British Formula Junior Champion in 1961.

He is not related to Stirling Moss, winner of 16 Grands Prix.

Complete Formula One World Championship results
(key)

References
Profile at oldracingcars.com

1933 births
2010 deaths
English racing drivers
English Formula One drivers
Sportspeople from Luton